Young Justice Bao is a 25-episode ancient legal drama series produced by the Television Corporation of Singapore in 1994. The drama stars Chew Chor Meng as the legendary Song Dynasty jurist Bao Zheng.

Cast

Chew Chor Meng as Bao Zheng
Chen Hanwei as Bai Yutang
Zhang Wenxiang as Zhan Zhao
Eugena Lee as Li Ke
Cherie Lim as Li Jue
Chen Shucheng as Li Wenye
Richard Low as Imperial Tutor Pang
Fu Youming as Pang Yu
Chen Tianwen as Di Qing
Wang Guanwu as Emperor Renzong of Song
Zhou Shiqiang as Wen Yanbo
Zhu Yuye as Empress Dowager Liu
Liang Tian as Guo Huai
Lin Xiulian as Kou Zhu
Huang Shaoting as Consort Li
Yang Tianfu as Wang Chao
Wu Kaishen as Ma Han
Lin Qinyuan as Fan Zonghua
Li Yuejie as Yelü Xiong
Li Yinzhu as Xiao Yanyan

References

Singapore Chinese dramas
1994 Singaporean television series debuts
1994 Singaporean television series endings
Mandarin-language television shows
Television shows based on The Seven Heroes and Five Gallants